Carrot juice is juice produced from carrots.

Overview

Carrot juice has a particularly high content of β-carotene, a source of vitamin A, but it is also high in B complex vitamins like folate, and many minerals including calcium, copper, magnesium, potassium, phosphorus, and iron. A pound (454 g) of carrots will yield about a cup of juice (about 236 ml), which is a low yield compared to fruits like apples and oranges. However, carrot pulp is very tough; the main difficulty in juicing carrots is in separating the pulp from the juice. 

Like many products high in beta-carotene, it may cause temporary carotenoderma, a benign skin condition resulting in an orange-yellow hue to the skin. Drinking more than 3 cups of carrot juice in a 24-hour period over a prolonged period of time may be enough to cause the condition.
     
Carrot juice has a uniquely sweet flavour of concentrated carrots. Unlike many juices, it is opaque. It is often consumed as a health drink. Carrots have been made into soups and juices for hundreds of years. In America carrot juice was one of the first colorants used to make cheese a darker color.

Nutritional information
100 g of canned carrot juice contains the following nutritional information according to the United States Department of Agriculture (USDA):
 Calories : 40 kcal
 Protein: 0.95 g
 Fat: 0.15 g
 Carbohydrates: 9.28 g
 Dietary fibers: 0.8 g
 Cholesterol: 0 mg (insignificant amount)

See also

 V8
Green smoothie
 Juicing
 List of carrot dishes
 List of juices

References

External links 
Beta Carotene, Mayo Clinic

Vegetable juice
Carrot dishes
Iranian drinks